The strategic operations of the Red Army in World War II were major military events carried out  between 1941 and 1945 on the Eastern Front or in 1945 in the Far East during the Second World War. Such operations typically involved at least one Front – the largest military formation of the Soviet Armed Forces. The operations could be defensive, offensive, a withdrawal, an encirclement, or a siege – always conducted by at least two Services of the armed forces (the ground forces and the air forces) and often included the naval forces. In most cases the Stavka divided the strategic operations into operational phases which were large operations in their own right. In very few cases the phases were tactical, such as those requiring amphibious landings.

Introduction
In Soviet historiography, the Great Patriotic War is divided into periods:

 First (22 June 1941 – 18 November 1942)
 Second (19 November 1942 – 31 December 1943)
 Third (1 January 1944 – 9 May 1945)

The war with Japan, the Campaign in the Far East including the Manchurian strategic offensive operation, (9 August 1945 – 2 September 1945) is seen as a separate theater of operations from the Great Patriotic War.

During the course of the Second World War the Red Army carried out a number of different military operations. The scope of these operations, usually known by the major cities around which they took place, was usually termed "operational-strategic" or "strategic", depending on the scale. An "operational-strategic" operation was usually undertaken by at least a group of Armies or a single Front. A "strategic" operation usually demanded cooperation of several Fronts to achieve its objectives. In both cases the operations could last from a week to several months. strategic operations were combined into seasonal campaigns, because weather and ground conditions affected planning.

First period (22 June 1941 – 18 November 1942)

Summer–Autumn campaign of 1941 (22 June – 4 December)
 Axis Operation Barbarossa
Baltic operation (1941)  22 June – 9 July 1941
Baltic Border defensive Battles 22–24 June 1941
Battle of Raseiniai
Šiauliai counter-offensive operation 24–27 June 1941
Riga defensive (ru) : 28–30 June 1941
Pskov defensive (ru) : 4–9 July 1941
Battle of Hanko (1941) 22 June – 2 December 1941
 German Battle of Białystok-Minsk/Offensive Campaign in Belorussia 22–29 June 1941
Belorussian strategic defensive (ru) :  22 June – 9 July 1941
Belorussian Border defensive Battles 22–25 June 1941
Defense of Brest Fortress 22–30 June 1941
Battle of Vitebsk (1941) (ru) : 6–16 July 1941
Borisov-Lepel offensive (ru) : 6–9 July 1941
L'vov-Chernovitsy strategic defensive (ru) : 22 June – 9 July 1941
Ukrainian Border defensive Battles 22–27 June 1941
Battle of Brody (1941) (26–30 June 1941)
L'vov-Lutsk defensive 27 June – 2 July 1941
Stanislav-Proskurov defensive 3–6 July 1941
 German and Finnish Operation Arctic Fox 29 June – mid-July 1941
Arctic-Karelia strategic defensive (ru) : 29 June – 10 October 1941
Murmansk-Kandalaksha defensive 29 June – 19 September 1941
Vyborg-Keksholm defensive 29 June – 23 September 1941
Kestenga defensive 1 July – 10 October 1941
Defensives on the Petrozavodsk, Ukhinskom-Rugozerskom, and Olonetskom directions 1 July – 10 October 1941
Moldavian defensive 1–26 July 1941
Kiev strategic defensive (1941)  7 July – 26 September 1941
Korosten defensive 11 July – 20 August 1941
Novohrad-Volynskyi defensive 10 July – 20 August 1941
Uman defensive 15 July – 4 August 1941
Tiraspol-Melitopol defensive (ru) : 27 July – 28 September 1941
Kiev-Pryluky defensive 20 August – 26 September 1941
Malyn offensive 5–8 August 1941
Leningrad strategic defensive  10 July – 30 September 1941
Tallinn defensive (ru) : 10 July – 10 August 1941
Evacuation of Tallinn (1941)
Kingisepp–Luga defensive (ru) : 10 July – 23 September 1941
Soltsy-Dno offensive (ru) : 15–20 July 1941
Staraya-Russa offensive (ru) : 8–23 August 1941
Demyansk defensive (ru) : 6–26 September 1941
First Sinyavino offensive (ru) : 10–26 September 1941
Second Sinyavino offensive (ru) : 20–28 October 1941
Battle of Smolensk  10 July – 10 September 1941
Polotsk defensive (ru) : 2–16 July 1941
Smolensk defensive (ru) : 10 July – 10 August 1941
Smolensk offensive 21 July – 7 August 1941
Siege of Mogilev 3–26 July 1941
Rogachev–Zhlobin offensive (1941) (ru) : 13–24 July 1941
Gomel–Trubchevsk defensive (ru) : 24 July – 30 August 1941
Dukhovschina offensive (ru) :  17 August – 8 September 1941
Yelnya offensive 30 August – 8 September 1941
Roslavl–Novozybkov offensive 30 August – 12 September 1941
Odessa defensive 5 August – 16 October 1941
 German operation Wotan (Angriff am Moskow) 9 September
Donbas–Rostov strategic defensive operation (ru) : 29 September – 16 November 1941
Battle of the Sea of Azov 26 September – 11 October 1941
Sumy–Kharkov defensive 30 September – 30 November 1941
Defence of Kharkov (1941) (20–24 October 1941)
German First Battle of Kharkov
 Axis Crimean Campaign 26 September 1941 – 15 May 1942
Donbas defensive operation (1941) (ru) : 29 September – 4 November 1941
Rostov defensive (ru) : 5–16 November 1941
Moscow strategic defensive  30 September – 5 December 1941
Orel-Bryansk defensive operation (ru) : 30 September – 23 October 1941
Vyazma defensive operation (ru) : 2–13 October 1941
Kalinin Defensive Operation (ru) : 10 October – 4 December 1941
Mozhaisk-Maloyaroslavets defensive (ru) : 10–30 October 1941
Tula defensive (ru) : 24 October – 5 December 1941
Klin-Solnechnogorsk Defensive (ru) : 15 November – 5 December 1941
Naro-Fominsk defensive (ru) : 1–5 December 1941
Tikhvin defensive (ru) : 16 October – 18 November 1941
Crimean defensive 18 October – 16 November 1941
Defense of Sevastopol 30 October 1941 – 4 July 1942
Tikhvin offensive (ru) : 10 November – 30 December 1941
Tikhvin-Kirishsk offensive (ru) : 12 November – 30 December 1941
Malo-Vishersk offensive (ru) : 10 November – 30 December 1941
Rostov strategic offensive  17 November – 2 December 1941
Bolshekrepinsk offensive 17–27 November 1941
Rostov offensive 27 November – 2 December 1941

Winter campaign of 1941/42 (5 December 1941 – 30 April 1942)
Moscow strategic offensive 5 December 1941 – 7 January 1942
Kalinin Offensive (ru) : 5 December 1941 – 7 January 1942
Klin–Solnechnogorsk offensive (ru) : 6–25 December 1941
Yelets offensive (ru) : 6–16 December 1941
Tula offensive (ru) : 6–16 December 1941
Kaluga offensive (ru) : 17 December 1941 – 5 January 1942
Naro–Fominsk offensive : 24 December 1941 – 8 January 1942
Kerch–Feodosia amphibious operation 25 December 1941 – 2 January 1942
Kerch landing 25 December 1941 – 2 January 1942
Feodosia landing 25 December 1941 – 2 January 1942
Oboyan–Kursk offensive (ru) : 3–26 January 1942
Lyuban offensive 7 January – 30 April 1942
Demyansk offensive – first phase (1942) 7 January – 20 May 1942
Orel–Bolkhov offensive 8 January – 28 April 1942
Rzhev–Vyazma strategic offensive (ru) : 8 January – 20 April 1942
Sychyovka–Vyazma offensive 8 January – 28 February 1942
Mozhaysk–Vyazma offensive (Operation Jupiter)10 January – 28 February 1942
Toropets–Kholm offensive 9 January – 6 February 1942
Vyazma Airborne 18 January – 28 February 1942
Rzhev–Vyazma offensive (1942) 3 March – 20 April 1942
Demyansk offensive – second phase (1942) 7 January – 20 May 1942
Barvenkovo–Lozovaya offensive 18–31 January 1942
Crimean offensive 27 January – 15 April 1942
Bolkhov offensive 24 March – 3 April 1942

Summer–Autumn campaign of 1942 (1 May – 18 November)
German Demjansk Pocket 8 February – 21 April 1942
Volkhov offensive 24 March – 3 April 1942
Murmansk offensive (ru) : 28 April – 13 May 1942
Battle of the Kerch Peninsula 8–19 May 1942
Izium bridgehead offensive 12–29 May 1942
Rescue of 2nd Shock Army (ru): 13 May – 10 July 1942
 Axis Operation Wilhelm 10–15 June 1942
 Axis Operation Fridericus II 22–25 June 1942
Axis Case Blue 28 June – 19 August 1942
German Fall Kremel ("Case Kremlin" in English) was a German deception for a summer offensive aimed at Moscow
 Axis Case Blue – Woronesh Army Group B
 Axis Case Blue – Stalingrad 6th Army
 Axis Case Blue – Baku Army Group A
Voronezh–Voroshilovgrad strategic defensive  28 June – 24 July 1942
1st Kastornoye defensive 28 June – 10 July 1942
2nd Kastornoye defensive 9–24 July 1942
Valuiki–Rossosh defensive 28 June – 24 July 1942
Voroshilovgrad–Shakhty defensive 7–24 July 1942
Donbas defensive (1942) (ru) : 7–24 July 1942
Battle of Rostov (1942) 19–24 July 1942
 German Operation Seydlitz 12 July 1942
Stalingrad strategic defensive  17 July – 18 November 1942
Defensive battles at distant approaches (ru) :  17 July – 17 August 1942
Defensive battles on near approaches and in Stalingrad 19 August – 18 November 1942
First Rzhev–Sychyovka offensive 30 July – 1 October 1942
Sinyavino offensive 19 August – 10 October 1942
Kozelsk offensive 22 August 1942 – 9 September 1942
 Axis Operation Braunschweig 23 July 1942 –
 Axis Operation Edelweiss 23 July – 21 August 1942
North Caucasian strategic defensive  25 July – 31 December 1942
Tikhoretsk-Stavropol Defensive Operation : 25 July – 5 August 1942
Armavir-Maikop Defensive Operation (ru) : 6–17 August 1942
Krasnodar Defensive Operation (ru) : 7–14 August 1942
Novorossiysk Defensive Operation (ru) : 19 August – 26 September 1942
Mozdok-Malgobek Defensive Operation (ru) : 1–28 September 1942
1940–44 insurgency in Chechnya
 Axis Operation Blücher 2 September 1942
Tuapse Defensive Operation (ru) : 25 September – 20 December 1942
Nalckik-Ordzhonikidze Defensive Operation (ru) : 25 October – 12 November 1942

Second period (19 November 1942 – 31 December 1943)

Winter campaign of 1942–1943 (19 November 1942 – 3 March 1943)
Stalingrad strategic offensive  19 November 1942 – 2 February 1943
Operation Uranus 19–30 November 1942
Kotelnikovo offensive 12–31 December 1942
Tatsinskaya Raid 16–28 December 1942
Operation Winter Storm 12–23 December 1942
Middle Don offensive (Operation Little Saturn) 16–30 December 1942
Operation Koltso (Operation Ring) 10 January – 2 February 1943
Second Rzhev–Sychyovka offensive (Operation Mars)  25 November – 20 December 1942
Sychevka offensive 24 November – 14 December 1942
Belyi offensive 25 November – 16 December 1942
Luchesa offensive 25 November – 11 December 1942
Molodoi Tud offensive 25 November – 23 December 1942
Velikie-Luki offensive 24 November 1942 – 20 January 1943
North Caucasian strategic offensive  1 January – 4 February 1943
Salsk-Rostov offensive (or Battle of Rostov (1943)) : 1 January – 4 February 1943
Mozdok-Stavropol offensive : 1–24 January 1943
Novorossiysk-Maikop offensive : 11 January – 4 February 1943
Tikhoretsk-Eisk offensive : 24 January – 4 February 1943
Axis Defence of the Kuban bridgeheads
Operation Iskra (Operation Spark, breaking of the Leningrad Blockade)  12–30 January 1943
Krasnoborsko-Smerdynskaya offensive
Voronezh–Kharkov strategic offensive (ru) : 13 January – 3 March 1943
Ostrogozhsk-Rossosh offensive 13–27 January 1943
Voronezh-Kastornoye offensive 24 January – 2 February 1943
Voroshilovgrad offensive (Operation Skachok) 29 January – 18 February 1943
Kharkov offensive (Operation Zvezda) 2 February – 3 March 1943
Orel (Maloarkhangelsk) offensive (ru) : 5–28 February 1943
Lvov offensive 15 February – 1 March 1943
Donbas Mariupol offensive 16–23 February 1943
Krasnodar offensive (ru) : 9 February – 24 May 1943
Operation Polar Star 10 February – 1 April 1943
Battle of Krasny Bor 10–13 February 1943
Demyansk offensive 15–28 February 1943
Staraya Russa operation (ru) : 4–19 March 1943
 German Operation Büffel 1–22 March 1943
Rzhev–Vyazma offensive (1943)  2–31 March 1943
Dmitriyev-Sevsk offensive (ru) : 24 February – 28 March 1943
Kharkov defensive 4–25 March 1943
German Third Battle of Kharkov
1st Taman offensive 4 April – 10 May 1943
2nd Taman offensive 26 May 1943 – 22 August 1944

Summer–Autumn campaign of 1943 (1 July – 31 December)
German Operation Citadel
Kursk strategic defensive (ru) :   5–23 July 1943
Orel–Kursk Defensive (ru) : 5–11 July 1943
Belgorod–Kursk defensive 5–23 July 1943
Orel strategic offensive (Operation Kutuzov)  12 July – 18 August 1943
Volkhov–Orel offensive 12 July – 18 August 1943
Kromyv–Orel offensive 15 July – 18 August 1943
Donbas strategic offensive (July 1943)  17 July – 2 August 1943
Izyum-Barvenkovo offensive (ru) : 17–27 July 1943
Mius offensive (ru) : 17 July – 2 August 1943
1st Mga offensive (ru) (or Fifth Sinyavino offensive) : 22 July – 22 August 1943
Belgorod–Khar'kov strategic offensive (Operation Rumyantsev)  3–23 August 1943
Belgorod–Bogodukhov offensive 3–23 August 1943
Belgorod–Kharkov offensive 3–23 August 1943
Zmiev offensive 12–23 August 1943
Mirgorod direction offensive 3–25 August 1943
Smolensk strategic offensive (Operation Suvorov)  7 August – 2 October 1943
Spas–Demensk offensive (ru) : 7–20 August 1943
Dukhovshchina–Demidov offensive 1st Stage 13–18 August 1943
Yelnia–Dorogobuzh offensive (ru) : 28 August – 6 September 1943
Dukhovshchina–Demidov offensive 2nd Stage (ru) : 14 September – 2 October 1943
Smolensk–Roslavl offensive (ru) : 15 September – 2 October 1943
Bryansk offensive 17 August – 3 October 1943
Donbas strategic offensive (August 1943)  13 August – 22 September 1943
Barvenkov-Pavlograd offensive 13 August – 22 September 1943
Mius–Mariupol offensive 18 August – 22 September 1943
Chernigov-Poltava offensive (ru) : 26 August 1943 – 30 September 1943
Chernigov-Pripyat offensive (ru) : 26 August – 30 September 1943
Sumy–Priluky offensive (ru) : 26 August – 30 September 1943
Poltava-Kremenchug offensive (ru) : 26 August – 30 September 1943
Novorossiysk-Taman operation (ru) : 10 September – 9 October 1943
Novorossiysk amphibious operation (ru) : 10–16 September 1943
Taman offensive (1943) 10 September – 9 October 1943
2nd Mga offensive 15–18 September 1943
Operation Concert (partisan offensive in support of Operation Suvorov) 19 September 1943
Lower Dnieper offensive  26 September – 20 December 1943
Axis Defence of the Panther–Wotan line
Kremenchug offensive 26 September – 10 October 1943
Melitopol Offensive (ru) : 26 September – 5 November 1943
Zaporizhia offensive (ru) : 10–14 October 1943
Kremenchug-Pyatikhatki Offensive (ru) : 15 October – 3 November 1943
Dnepropetrovsk offensive (ru) : 23 October – 23 December 1943
Krivoi Rog offensive 14–21 November 1943
Apostolovo offensive 14 November – 23 December 1943
Nikopol offensive 14 November – 31 December 1943
Aleksandriia–Znamenka offensive (ru) : 22 November – 9 December 1943
Krivoi Rog offensive 10–19 December 1943
Kiev strategic offensive (October 1943)  1–24 October 1943
Chernobyl–Radomysl offensive 1–4 October 1943
Chernobyl–Gornostaipol defensive 3–8 October 1943
Lyutezh offensive 11–24 October 1943
1st Bukrin offensive 12–15 October 1943
2nd Bukrin offensive 21–24 October 1943
Byelorussian strategic offensive (1943)  3 October – 31 December 1943
1st Gomel–Rechitsa offensive 30 September – 30 October 1943
Nevel offensive 3–12 October 1943
1st Orsha offensive 3–26 October 1943
Battle of Lenino 12–13 October 1943
Vitebsk (Riga) offensive 18–30 October 1943
Idritsa offensive 18–30 October 1943
Pskov offensive 18–30 October 1943
Polotsk–Vitebsk offensive 2–21 November 1943
Pustoshka-Idritsa offensive 2–21 November 1943
2nd Gomel-Rechitsa Offensive (ru) : 10–30 November 1943
2nd Orsha offensive 14 November – 5 December 1943
Novyi Bykhov–Propoisk offensive 22–30 November 1943
Kalinkovichi offensive 8–11 December 1943
Gorodok offensive (ru) : 13–31 December 1943
Idritsa-Opochka offensive 16 December 1943 – 15 January 1944
Kalinkovichi defensive 20–27 December 1943
Kerch–Eltigen operation 31 October – 11 December 1943
Kiev strategic offensive operation (November 1943) (ru) :  3–13 November 1943
Kiev strategic defensive (1943) (ru) : 13 November – 22 December 1943

Third period (1 January 1944 – 9 May 1945)

Winter Spring campaign of 1944 (1 January – 31 May)
Dnieper–Carpathian offensive  24 December 1943 – 17 April 1944
Zhitomir–Berdichev offensive 24 December 1943 – 14 January 1944
Kirovograd offensive 5–16 January 1944
Korsun–Shevchenkovsky offensive 24 January – 17 February 1944
German Korsun–Cherkassy Pocket
Rovno–Lutsk offensive 1 Stage 27 January – 11 February 1944
Nikopol–Krivoi Rog offensive 2 Stage 30 January – 29 February 1944
Proskurov–Chernovtsy offensive 4 March – 17 April 1944
Uman–Botoşani offensive 5 March 1944 – 17 April 1944
Bereznegovatoye–Snigirevka offensive (ru) : 6–18 March 1944
Polesskoe offensive (ru) : 15 March – 5 April 1944
Odessa offensive 26 March – 14 April 1944
Kalinkovichi-Mozyr offensive (ru) : 8–30 January 1944
Ozarichi-Ptich offensive 16–30 January 1944
Vitebsk offensive (ru) : 3 February – 13 March 1944
Leningrad–Novgorod strategic offensive  14 January – 1 March 1944
Krasnoye Selo–Ropsha offensive 14–30 January 1944
Novgorod–Luga offensive (ru) : 14 January – 15 February 1944
Kingisepp–Gdov offensive 1 February – 1 March 1944
Staraya Russa-Novorzhev Offensive (ru) : 18 February – 1 March 1944
German: Battle of Narva 2 February – 10 August 1944
Battle for Narva Bridgehead 2 February – 26 July 1944
Narva offensive (15–28 February 1944)
Rogachev–Zhlobin offensive (ru) : 21–26 February 1944
Narva offensive (1–4 March 1944)
Narva offensive (18–24 March 1944)
Crimean strategic offensive  8 April – 12 May 1944
Perekop–Sevastopol offensive 8 April – 12 May 1944
Kerch–Sevastopol offensive 11 April – 12 May 1944
First Jassy–Kishinev offensive 8 April – 6 June 1944
First Battle of Târgu Frumos : 9–12 April 1944
Battle of Podu Iloaiei : 12 April 1944
Second Battle of Târgu Frumos : 2–8 May 1944

Summer–Autumn campaign of 1944 (1 June – 31 December)
Vyborg–Petrozavodsk offensive : 10 June – 9 August 1944
 Vyborg offensive (ru) : 10–20 June 1944
 Koivisto landing operation (ru) : 20–25 June 1944
 Battle of Tienhaara : 22 June 1944
 Battle of Tali-Ihantala : 25 June – 9 July 1944
 Battle of Vyborg Bay (1944) : 30 June 30 – 10 July 1944
 Battle of Vuosalmi : 4–17 July 1944
Svir–Petrozavodsk offensive (ru) : 21 June – 9 August 1944
Tuloksinskaia landing offensive (ru) : 23–27 June 1944
 Battle of Nietjärvi : 15–17 July 1944
 Battle of Ilomantsi : 6 July – 13 August 1944
Byelorussian strategic offensive (Operation Bagration)  23 June – 29 August 1944
Vitebsk–Orsha offensive 23–28 June 1944
Mogilev offensive 23–28 June 1944
Bobruysk offensive 24–29 June 1944
Polotsk offensive 29 June – 4 July 1944
Minsk offensive 29 June – 4 July 1944
Vilnius offensive 5–20 July 1944
Šiauliai offensive 5–31 July 1944
Belostock offensive 5–27 July 1944
Lublin–Brest offensive 18 July – 2 August 1944
Battle of Radzymin (1944)
Kaunas offensive 28 July – 28 August 1944
Osovets offensive 6–14 August 1944
Rezhitsa–Dvinsk offensive (ru) : 10–27 July 1944
Pskov–Ostrov offensive (ru) : 11–31 July 1944
 German – Operation Doppelkopf 16–27 August 1944
Lemberg–Sandomierz strategic offensive  13 July – 29 August 1944
Lvov offensive (ru) : 13–27 July 1944
Stanislav offensive 13–27 July 1944
Sandomierz offensive 28 July – 29 August 1944
Narva offensive 24–30 July 1944
German: Battle of Tannenberg Line 26 July – 10 August 1944
Madona offensive (ru) : 1–28 August 1944
Tartu offensive 10 August – 6 September 1944
Jassy–Kishinev strategic offensive 20–29 August 1944
Yassi–Focsani offensive 20–29 August 1944
Kishinev–Izmail offensive 20–29 August 1944
Bucharest–Arad offensive (or the Romanian operation) (ru) : 30 August – 3 October 1944 
East Carpathian strategic offensive (ru) : 8–28 September 1944
Carpathian–Dukla offensive 8–28 September 1944
Carpathian-Uzhgorod offensive (ru) : 9–28 September 1944
Baltic offensive  14 September – 24 November 1944
Riga offensive 14 September – 24 October 1944
Tallinn offensive 17–26 September 1944
Moonsund landing 5–22 October 1944
Memel offensive 27 September – 24 November 1944
Courland Pocket 9 October 1944 – 8 May 1945
Belgrade offensive  14 September – 24 November 1944
Niš operation 8–14 October 1944
Battle of Batina 11–29 November 1944
Debrecen offensive 6–28 October 1944
Petsamo–Kirkenes strategic offensive  7–29 October 1944
Goldap-Gumbinnen offensive 16–30 October 1944
Budapest strategic offensive  29 October 1944 – 13 February 1945
Kecskemét-Budapest offensive 29 October – 10 December 1944
Szolnok–Budapest offensive 29 October – 10 December 1944
Nyiregyhaza–Miskolc offensive 1 November – 10 December 1944
Apatin-Kaposvár offensive (ru) : 7 November – 31 December 1944
Esztergom–Komarno offensive 20 December 1944 – 15 January 1945
Szekesfehervar–Esztergom offensive 20 December 1944 – 13 February 1945
Assault on Budapest 27 December 1944 – 13 February 1945
German: Operation Konrad : 1–27 January 1945

Campaign in Europe 1945 (1 January – 9 May)
Vistula-Oder strategic offensive 12 January 1945 – 3 February 1945
Warsaw-Posen offensive (ru) : 14 January – 3 February 1945
Battle of Posen 24 January – 23 February 1945
Sandomierz–Silesian offensive 12 January – 3 February 1945
Western Carpathian strategic offensive (ru) :  12 January – 18 February 1945
Kosice–Poprad offensive 12–28 January 1945
Bel'sk offensive 29 January – 18 February 1945
Pleshevets–Breznovsk offensive 12 January – 18 February 1945
East Prussian strategic offensive  13 January – 25 April 1945
Insterburg–Königsberg offensive (ru) : 14–26 January 1945
Milau–Elbing offensive (ru) : 14–26 January 1945
Rastenburg–Heilsberg offensive 27 January – 12 February 1945
Braunsberg offensive 13–22 March 1945
German Heiligenbeil Pocket
Königsberg offensive 6–9 April 1945
Samland offensive 13–25 April 1945
Lower Silesian offensive 8–24 February 1945
German Siege of Breslau 13 February – 6 May 1945
East Pomeranian strategic offensive 10 February – 6 March 1945
Konitz-Köslin offensive operation 10 February – 6 March 1945
 German counteroffensive Operation Solstice 15–18 February 1945
Danzig offensive operation (ru) : 7–31 March 1945
Arnswalde–Kolberg offensive operation 1–18 March 1945
Altdamm offensive operation 18 March – 4 April 1945 (near Stettin)
 German Counteroffensive in Hungary Operation Southwind : 17–24 February 1945
 German Lake Balaton counteroffensive Operation Frühlingserwachen : 6 – 16 March 1945
Balaton defensive 6–15 March 1945
Bulgarian Battle of the Transdanubian Hills 6–21 March 1945
Moravian-Ostrau offensive (ru) : 10 March – 5 May 1945
Vienna offensive 13 March – 15 April 1945
Győr offensive 13 March – 4 April 1945
Veszprem offensive 16–25 March 1945
Sopron–Baden offensive 26 March – 4 April 1945
Nagykanizsa–Körmend offensive 26 March – 15 April 1945
Assault on Vienna (ru) : 4–13 April 1945
Upper Silesian offensive 15–31 March 1945
Bratislva–Bruenn offensive 25 March – 5 May 1945
Graz–Amstetten offensive (ru) : 15 April – 9 May 1945 
Berlin strategic offensive  16 April – 8 May 1945
German Defence of the Oder–Neisse Line
Stettin–Rostock offensive operation (ru) : 16 April – 8 May 1945
German Defense of Schwedt Bridgehead 1 February – 3 March 1945
Seelow-Berlin offensive 16 April – 2 May 1945
Battle of Halbe (Halbe cauldron) 24 April – 1 May 1945
Cottbus–Potsdam offensive operation (ru) : 16 April – 8 May 1945
Spremberg–Torgau offensive operation (ru) : 16 April – 5 May 1945
Battle of Bautzen 21–30 April 1945
Brandenberg–Rathenow offensive 3–8 May 1945
Prague offensive  6–11 May 1945
Dresden–Prague offensive 6–11 May 1945
Sudeten offensive 6–11 May 1945
Olmuetz offensive 6–9 May 1945
Iglau–Beneschau offensive 6–11 May 1945
Soviet Invasion of the Danish Island of Bornholm 7 May 1945

See also
List of military operations on the Eastern Front of World War II
Winter Campaign of 1941–1942

Notes

References

External links
Multimedia map of World War II

 

Battles and operations of the Eastern Front of World War II
Battles and operations of the Soviet–German War
Historiography of Russia
Military strategy
Russian and Soviet military-related lists

ca:Operacions de la Segona Guerra Mundial#Front Oriental